Léon Bloy (11 July 1846 – 3 November 1917) was a French Catholic novelist, essayist, pamphleteer (or lampoonist), and satirist, known additionally for his eventual (and passionate) defense of Catholicism and for his influence within French Catholic circles.

Biography
Bloy was born on 11 July 1846 in Notre-Dame-de-Sanilhac, in the arondissement of Périgueux, Dordogne. He was the second of six sons of Jean-Baptiste Bloy, a Voltairean freethinker, and Anne-Marie Carreau, a stern disciplinarian and pious Spanish-Catholic daughter of a Napoleonic soldier. After an agnostic and unhappy youth in which he cultivated an intense hatred for the Catholic Church and its teaching, his father found him a job in Paris, where he went in 1864. In December 1868, he met the aging Catholic author Barbey d'Aurevilly, who lived opposite him in rue Rousselet and who became his mentor. Shortly afterwards, he underwent a dramatic religious conversion.

Bloy was a friend of the author Joris-Karl Huysmans, the painter Georges Rouault, the philosophers Jacques and Raïssa Maritain and was instrumental in reconciling these intellectuals with Catholicism. However, he acquired a reputation for bigotry because of his frequent outbursts of temper. For example, in 1885, after the death of Victor Hugo, whom Bloy believed to be an atheist, Bloy decried Hugo's "senility," "avarice," and "hypocrisy," identifying Hugo among "contemplatives of biological scum." Bloy's first novel, Le Désespéré, a fierce attack on rationalism and those he believed to be in league with it, made him fall out with the literary community of his time and even many of his old friends. Soon, Bloy could count such prestigious authors as Émile Zola, Guy de Maupassant, Ernest Renan, and Anatole France as his enemies.

In addition to his published works, he left a large body of correspondence with public and literary figures. He died on 3 November 1917 in Bourg-la-Reine.

Criticisms
Bloy was noted for personal attacks, but he saw them as the mercy or indignation of God. According to Jacques Maritain, he used to say: "My anger is the effervescence of my pity."

Among the many targets of Bloy's attacks were people of business. In an essay in Pilgrim of the Absolute, he compared the businessmen of Chicago unfavourably to the cultured people of Paris:

Our Lady of La Salette
Inspired by both the millennialist visionary  and the reports of an apparition at La Salette—Our Lady of La Salette—Bloy was convinced that the Virgin's message was that if people did not reform, the end time was imminent. He was particularly critical of the attention paid to the shrine at Lourdes and resented the fact that it distracted people from what he saw as the less sentimental message of La Salette.

Influence
Bloy is quoted in the epigraph at the beginning of Graham Greene's novel The End of the Affair, though Greene claimed that "this irate man lacked creative instinct." He is further quoted in the essay "The Mirror of Enigmas" by the Argentine writer Jorge Luis Borges, who acknowledged his debt to him by naming him in the foreword to his short story collection Artifices as one of seven authors who were in "the heterogeneous list of the writers I am continually re-reading." In his novel The Harp and the Shadow, Alejo Carpentier excoriates Bloy as a raving, Columbus-defending lunatic during Vatican deliberations over the explorer's canonization. Bloy is also quoted at the beginning of John Irving's A Prayer for Owen Meany, and there are several quotations from his Letters to my Fiancée in Charles Williams's anthology The New Christian Year. Le Désespéré was republished in 2005 by Éditions Underbahn with a preface by Maurice G. Dantec. In Chile historian Jaime Eyzaguirre came to be influenced by Bloy's writings.

According to the historian John Connelly, Bloy's Le Salut par les Juifs, with its apocalyptically radical interpretation of chapters 9 to 11 of Paul's Letter to the Romans, had a major influence on the Catholic theologians of the Second Vatican Council responsible for section 4 of the council's declaration Nostra aetate,  the doctrinal basis for a revolutionary change in the Catholic Church's attitude to Judaism.

In 2013, Pope Francis surprised many by quoting Bloy during his first homily as pope: “When one does not confess Jesus Christ, I am reminded of the expression of Léon Bloy: ‘He who does not pray to the Lord prays to the devil.’ When one does not confess Jesus Christ, one confesses the worldliness of the devil.”

Bloy and his effect on 21st-century French scholars make a significant appearance in Michel Houellebecq's 2015 novel Submission.

Works

Novels 
 Le Désespéré (1887) (The Desperate Man translated into English by Richard Robinson. Snuggly Books, 2020)
 La Femme pauvre (1897) (The Woman Who Was Poor translated into English by I. J. Collins. St. Augustines Press, 2015)

Essays
 "Le Révélateur du Globe: Christophe Colomb & Sa Béatification Future" (1884) (In English translation: "The Revealer of the Globe: Christopher Columbus and His Future Beatification" (Part One). Sunny Lou Publishing, 2021)
 "Propos d'un entrepreneur de démolitions" (1884) ("Words of a Demolitions Contractor" translated into English by Richard Robinson. Sunny Lou Publishing Company, 2020)
 "Le Salut par les Juifs" (1892) ("Salvation through the Jews" translated into English by Richard Robinson. Sunny Lou Publishing Company, 2020)
 "Léon Bloy devant les cochons" (1894)
 "Je m'accuse" (1900) ("I accuse myself"), in response to Émile Zola's 1898 open letter J'Accuse…! (Je M'Accuse... translated into English by Richard Robinson. Sunny Lou Publishing Company, 2020)
 "Le Fils de Louis XVI" (1900) ("The Son of Louis XVI", in English translation. Sunny Lou Publishing , 2022)
 "Exégèse des lieux communs" (1902–12) ("Exegesis of the Commonplaces", translated into English by Louis Cancelmi. Wiseblood Books , 2021)
 "Belluaires et porchers" (1905) ("Gladiators and swineherds")
 "Le Résurrection de Villiers de lʼIsle-Adam" (1906) ("The Resurrection of Villiers de l'Isle-Adam", in English translation. Sunny Lou Publishing, 2022)
 "L'épopée byzantine et Gustave Schlumberger" (1906)
 "Celle qui pleure" (1908) ("She Who Weeps", in English translation and published by Sunny Lou Publishing, 2021)
 "Le Sang du Pauvre" (1909) ("Blood of the Poor", translated into English, and published by Sunny Lou Publishing, 2021)
 "L'Ame de Napoléon" (1912) ("The Soul of Napoleon." In English translation: Sunny Lou Publishing Company, 2021) 
 "Sur la Tombe de Huysmans" (1913)  (In English translation: On Huysmans' Tomb: Critical reviews of J.-K. Huysmans and À Rebours, En Rade, and Là-Bas. Sunny Lou Publishing Company, 2021)  
 "Jeanne d'Arc et l'Allemagne" (1915) ("Joan of Arc and Germany." In English translation: Sunny Lou Publishing Company, 2021)
 "Constantinople et Byzance" (1917) ("Constantinople and Byzantium." In English translation: Sunny Lou Publishing Company, 2022)

Short stories
 Sueur de sang (1893) ("Sweating blood" In English translation: Wakefield Press, 2016)
 Histoires désobligeantes (1894) (Disagreeable tales)

Diaries
 Le Mendiant ingrat (1898) ("The Ungrateful Beggar")
 Mon Journal (1904) ("My diary")
 Quatre ans de captivité à Cochons-sur-Marne (1905) ("Four Years of Captivity in Cochons-sur-Marne: 1900-1904," Sunny Lou Publishing Company, 2022.) 
 L'Invendable (1909) ("The Unsaleable")
 Le Vieux de la montagne (1911) ("The Old Man from the Mountain")
 Le Pèlerin de l'Absolu (1914) ("The Pilgrim of the Absolute", edited by David Bentley Hart. Cluny Media, LLC, 2017)
 Au seuil de l'Apocalypse (1916) ("On the Threshold of the Apocalypse." In English translation: Sunny Lou Publishing Company, 2021.) 
 Méditations d'un solitaire en 1916 (1917)
 La Porte des humbles (posth., 1920) ("The Door of the Lowly")

A study in English is Léon Bloy by Rayner Heppenstall (Cambridge: Bowes & Bowes, 1953).

Quotations
 "Love does not make you weak, because it is the source of all strength, but it makes you see the nothingness of the illusory strength on which you depended before you knew it."
 "There is only one tragedy in the end, not to have been a saint."
 "But I love Paris, which is the place of intelligence, and I feel Paris threatened by this truly tragic lampstand sprouting from its belly, which will be visible at night from twenty leagues away ..."
 “The rich man is an inexorable brute whom one is forced to stop with a pitchfork or a round of grapeshot in the belly...”
 “And they [rich Catholics] dare to speak of charity, to pronounce the word Caritas which is the very Name of the divine Third Person! Prostitution of words enough to put fear in the devil! That beautiful lady, who does not have the honesty even to surrender her body to the poor souls whom she arouses, will go, this very evening, to show all that she can of her white, sepulchral flesh where jewels like worms quiver, and make herself worshipped by imbeciles, on supposed feast days of charity, on the occasion of some disaster, to fatten the sharks or shipwreckers a little more. The so-called Christian riches ejaculating on misery!”

References

Sources

 

Rayner Heppenstall 'Léon Bloy', (1953) Bowes & Bowes, Cambridge. (1954) Yale University Press, New Haven.

External links
 
 

1846 births
1917 deaths
19th-century French essayists
19th-century French novelists
19th-century French poets
19th-century Roman Catholics
Converts to Roman Catholicism from atheism or agnosticism
Christian novelists
Christian humanists
French Catholic poets
French diarists
French male essayists
French male novelists
French male poets
French people of Spanish descent
French Roman Catholic writers
Our Lady of La Salette
People from Périgueux
French political commentators